Brandon Bailey may refer to:

Brandon Bailey (weightlifter) (1932–2013), Trinidad and Tobago weightlifter
Brandon Bailey (basketball), American professional basketball coach
Brandon Bailey (baseball) (born 1994), American professional baseball pitcher